Cyril Harry Parfitt (6 February 1914 – 30 October 2011) was a British artist. He was based on the Isle of Thanet in Kent and works using mixed materials and techniques. His notable works include the hand-rendered pencil drawing 'The New Arrivals' which was hung in the Royal Academy.

Biography

Early life
Cyril was born in Norwich, Norfolk, England. He attended the prestigious Gateway School in Leicester and then won a scholarship to Leicester College of Art where he studied for three years. His passions were art and music, he also played the accordion well as a young man. He went on to play both piano and electric keyboard which he still enjoys. He speaks fluent German and cited the reason for learning it as wanting to enjoy reading Goethe in the language it was written. His early career saw him serve an apprenticeship as a lithographic artist.

He worked as a graphic designer in Leicester where his work was frequently seen on many well-known products, until he joined the army at the outbreak of Second World War. Because of his experience as a lithographic artist he was eventually posted to Wales where he was trained in the art of map making and given the task of drafting invasion maps. Here he was to establish a close enduring friendship with the renowned artist Terence Cuneo.

Career
Taking this skill with him at the end of the Second World War, he joined a new Government Department, Directorate of Overseas Surveys (DOS) where he ran his own experimental section. Here he was nicknamed The Wizard of DOS such was his extraordinary talent and problem solving abilities. One of his colleagues once said 'You can put Cyril in a room with absolutely nothing and he will still somehow manage to produce something utterly wonderful'.

Using his previous printing experience and knowledge he was responsible for designing and supervising colour proofing on specialised relief maps. He innovated new approaches to relief effects and developed a technique for photo mapping.

He prepared international exhibitions and his special maps were acclaimed worldwide by cartographic establishments. Two such pieces were exhibited at the Design Centre in London. His contribution to mapping was written about and included in a book produced by the National Geographic.

His early paintings were of a whimsical nature although he is a competent artist in the conventional style with landscape being a favourite subject. His portraiture and pencil drawings have a lightness and sensitivity much admired.

His fantasy sculptural pieces have been produced in clay and his moving sculptures use an assortment of bright and colourful 'odds and ends' he has salvaged and stored, truly 'green' pieces of work. He has always had an eye for the bright and glittering, the vivid and arresting and toyed with the idea of working with stained glass at one point in his career. He has appeared ITV's Magpie with his creations and his work has been sold in galleries both in the United Kingdom and throughout the world.

Many of his pieces of artwork have been selected by the Royal Academy. His pencil drawing 'Looking Back' which took 700 hours and consists of over 6,000 pencil strokes was hung in 1981.  Acclaimed as 'an amazing technical feat' by The Academy, it is a favourite piece with his many fans.

Now based on the Isle of Thanet where he has been for some time his technical 'feet' aren't as lively but his mind has lost none of its clarity and vision. Seldom seen without pencil and paper, even when confined to a hospital bed, he is always doodling and creating sketches of his own fantasy world. Particularly inspired by the ‘Turner’ skies here he has started to incorporate them into some of his work. He is delighted to see the Turner Contemporary Gallery taking shape and looks with interest to the artistic endeavours of the local area to assist the regeneration of this beautiful part of the country.

References

External links 
 
 Facebook Fan Page
 a-n Magazine article

20th-century British painters
British male painters
21st-century British painters
People from Thanet (district)
Fantasy artists
1914 births
2011 deaths
British Army personnel of World War II
Artists from Norwich
20th-century British male artists
21st-century British male artists